The nanoscopic scale (or nanoscale) usually refers to structures with a length scale applicable to nanotechnology, usually cited as 1–100 nanometers (nm). A nanometer is a billionth of a meter. The nanoscopic scale is (roughly speaking) a lower bound to the mesoscopic scale for most solids.

For technical purposes, the nanoscopic scale is the size at which fluctuations in the averaged properties (due to the motion and behavior of individual particles) begin to have a significant effect (often a few percent) on the behavior of a system, and must be taken into account in its analysis.

The nanoscopic scale is sometimes marked as the point where the properties of a material change; above this point, the properties of a material are caused by 'bulk' or 'volume' effects, namely which atoms are present, how they are bonded, and in what ratios. Below this point, the properties of a material change, and while the type of atoms present and their relative orientations are still important, 'surface area effects' (also referred to as quantum effects) become more apparent – these effects are due to the geometry of the material (how thick it is, how wide it is, etc.), which, at these low dimensions, can have a drastic effect on quantized states, and thus the properties of a material.

On October 8, 2014, the Nobel Prize in Chemistry was awarded to Eric Betzig, William Moerner and Stefan Hell for "the development of super-resolved fluorescence microscopy", which brings "optical microscopy into the nanodimension". Super resolution imaging helped define the nanoscopic process of substrate presentation.

Nanoscale machines

The most complex nanoscale molecular machines are proteins found within cells, often in the form of multi-protein complexes. Some biological machines are motor proteins, such as myosin, which is responsible for muscle contraction, kinesin, which moves cargo inside cells away from the nucleus along microtubules, and dynein, which moves cargo inside cells towards the nucleus and produces the axonemal beating of motile cilia and flagella. "In effect, the [motile cilium] is a nanomachine composed of perhaps over 600 proteins in molecular complexes, many of which also function independently as nanomachines." "Flexible linkers allow the mobile protein domains connected by them to recruit their binding partners and induce long-range allostery via protein domain dynamics." Other biological machines are responsible for energy production, for example ATP synthase which harnesses energy from proton gradients across membranes to drive a turbine-like motion used to synthesise ATP, the energy currency of a cell. Still other machines are responsible for gene expression, including DNA polymerases for replicating DNA, RNA polymerases for producing mRNA, the spliceosome for removing introns, and the ribosome for synthesising proteins. These machines and their nanoscale dynamics are far more complex than any molecular machines that have yet been artificially constructed.

Nanotechnology

Nanomachines

Nanomedicine

See also
Center for Probing the Nanoscale
Center for Nanoscale Materials

References

Nanotechnology